Ryu Seung-min (born August 5, 1982 in Seoul, South Korea) is a Korean table tennis player who won the gold medal at the 2004 Summer Olympics in the men's singles competition. His opponent was Wang Hao, a top-seeded player from the Chinese national team. Along the way, he defeated 1992 Olympic champion Jan-Ove Waldner with 4–1. At the 2008 and 2012 Summer Olympics he was part of the South Korean team that won the bronze and silver medals respectively. Ryu is ranked twenty-fifth in the world as of July 2013. In 2016, Ryu became a member of the International Olympic Committee (IOC), he was a member and Chair of the Athletes' Commission of the South Korean National Olympic Committee from 2016 to 2019. Since 2018, he counts among the ITTF Foundation Ambassadors, promoting sport for development and peace.

In March 2022, Ryu signed with World Star Entertainment.

Style 
Ryu Seung-min plays penhold style. Unlike players like Ma Lin and Wang Hao, Ryu never uses the backside of his blade – in fact, he does not even have rubber on it. Ryu relies on his outstanding footwork, explosive forehand loops and drives to win points. For some time he used Xiom (South Korea) table paddles and rubbers playing with his signature model "Ryu Seung Min Special" penhold and has been using ProZRSM ever since his victory at the 2004 Summer Olympics. Lately he switched again to Butterfly (Japan) equipment and now he uses their Ryu Seung-min G-Max blade with Tenergy 05.

As of December 1, 2012 he is ranked 20th in the world. His top ranking was world number 2 in September 2004, and since November 2001 he was always in top 25 of the ITTF world ranking list.

Career records
Singles (as of April 9, 2015)
 Olympics: Gold medal (2004).
 World Championships: SF (2007).
 World Cup appearances: 5. Record: runner-up (2007).
 Pro Tour winner (3): Egypt, USA Open 2004; Chile Open 2008. Runner-up (4): Swedish Open 2001; Brazil Open 2002; Japan Open 2005; Slovenian Open 2007; Kuwait Open 2012.
 Pro Tour Grand Finals appearances: 9. Record: SF (2003, 05, 10).
 Asian Games: SF (2006).
 Asian Championships: SF (2003).

Men's doubles
 Olympics: 4th (2000).
 World Championships: QF (2001, 05, 09).
 Pro Tour winner (8): China (Qingdao) Open 2002; Croatian, Egypt, USA Open 2004; Korea Open 2005; Chinese Taipei Open 2006; Kuwait Open 2007; Brazil Open 2012. Runner-up (4): China (Changchun) Open 2000; Korea Open 2010; Austrian Open 2010; Japan Open 2012.
 Pro Tour Grand Finals appearances: 4. Record: SF (2012).
 Asian Games: winner (2002).
 Asian Championships: SF (2005).

Mixed doubles
 World Championships: QF (2003).
 Asian Games: runner-up (2002).

Team
 Olympics: 3rd (2008), 2nd (2012).
 World Championships: 2nd (2006, 08); 3rd (2001, 04, 10, 12).
 World Team Cup: 2nd (2009); 3rd (2007).
 Asian Games: 2nd (2002, 06).
 Asian Championships: 2nd (2005).

Filmography

Television show

References

External links
 
 
 
 

1982 births
Living people
South Korean male table tennis players
Table tennis players at the 2000 Summer Olympics
Table tennis players at the 2004 Summer Olympics
Table tennis players at the 2008 Summer Olympics
Table tennis players at the 2012 Summer Olympics
Olympic table tennis players of South Korea
Olympic gold medalists for South Korea
Olympic bronze medalists for South Korea
Olympic medalists in table tennis
Asian Games medalists in table tennis
Olympic silver medalists for South Korea
Medalists at the 2012 Summer Olympics
Medalists at the 2008 Summer Olympics
Table tennis players at the 2006 Asian Games
Table tennis players at the 2002 Asian Games
Medalists at the 2004 Summer Olympics
Asian Games gold medalists for South Korea
Asian Games silver medalists for South Korea
Asian Games bronze medalists for South Korea
International Olympic Committee members
Medalists at the 2002 Asian Games
Medalists at the 2006 Asian Games
World Table Tennis Championships medalists
South Korean expatriate sportspeople in China